Beauval-en-Caux (literally Beauval in Caux) is a commune in the Seine-Maritime department in the Normandy region in northern France.

Geography

Heraldry

Population

Places of interest
 The château des Etangs, dating from the sixteenth century.
 The château Blanc, dating from the nineteenth century.
 The church of St.Pierre, dating from the eleventh century.
 The church of St. Geneviève, dating from the eleventh century.
 The chapel, from the sixteenth century.

See also
Communes of the Seine-Maritime department

References

Communes of Seine-Maritime